The Royal School Haslemere is an independent day and boarding school. It was established in 1995.  The school is on two sites in Haslemere and Hindhead in Surrey, England. It has a Christian foundation and accepts pupils from six weeks to 18 years. It was formerly a girls' only school.The school currently accepts students from 4 to 18 years.

History
The original Royal Naval School was founded in 1840 as The Royal Female School for the daughters of Naval and Marine Officers, one of the earliest academic girls' schools in England. The co-ancestor of The Royal School, The Grove School, was founded in the 1850s and was, equally, a pioneer in girls' education. From the outset the founders' ambition was for the girls to become independent.

The Royal Naval School
In 1815, the Battle of Waterloo finally put an end to the Napoleonic Wars. In the following peaceful years, the Navy was put on half or even quarter pay. Peace also brought an end to the prize money from captured ships, as the Navy had been at war nearly non-stop since the 1770s, the potential for Senior Officers to become wealthy and to set themselves up as country gentlemen had become established. The peace brought significant changes to their way of life. After Waterloo many Naval Officers found themselves in financial difficulty. They were able to send their young sons from age nine upwards to sea as mid-shipmen where they would gain an education and valuable experience. Their daughters, however, were in a more difficult position. They were too high up the social ladder to engage in any menial work to earn their own living but too poor to attract the attention of eligible husbands.
Admiral Jahleel Brenton, Admiral Sir Thomas Williams and Captain Hon. Francis Maude established The Royal Naval Female School as it was then known, specifically to provide a sound education which would enable the girls to go out into employment almost certainly as teachers and governesses. The school was founded for the daughters and sisters of Naval and Marine Officers.
Queen Victoria and the Queen Dowager were among the first subscribers and from the outset the School had the patronage of The Queen. The Patron, Her Majesty Queen Elizabeth II, opened the QEII Sixth Form building in 1989. In 1975 Princess Anne inherited the Presidency from her great-uncle, Lord Mountbatten of Burma, after whom the Humanities block is now named. Princess Anne has visited the school, her most recent visit being for Prize Day in 2010. The Princess Anne Sports Hall was opened by her in 1986.

The Grove School

The inheritance from The Grove School is interesting in terms of its intellectual adventurousness; from the start a thorough education was offered. The founder Mrs Lacey was devoted to the cause of women's education at a time when it was generally considered of minor importance. The Laceys were committed both to education and to the Christian faith; the name frequently appears through succeeding generations within The Grove records and beyond, in educational and missionary service abroad. Apart from lessons in their own establishment, extension classes at the University College of Nottingham – opened in 1881 – were well attended by both teachers and pupils. From the outset the school combined a significant commitment to charity work among disadvantaged girls in London with academic ambition. A number of its pupils were amongst the earliest female students at Oxford and Cambridge. The second Headmistress, Miss Lacey, who took over from her mother, Mrs Lacey, achieved a first class degree in Modern History in the 1890s. It was not until the 1920s, when Oxford formally decided to confer degrees on female pupils, that Miss Lacey was among the number of middle aged people whose academic achievements were finally recognised.

The Royal School
The two schools joined together in 1995. The pupils are accepted from six weeks (for daycare) and up to 18 years.
There are elements of the uniform that have a historical connection – the girls' suit jackets are cut short in the naval style and the tippets are as used at the funeral of Queen Alexandra in 1925.

The founder schools were among the first to take the education of girls seriously.

References

External links

The Royal School Haslemere
Profile on MyDaughter
Independent Schools Inspectorate Inspection Reports

Private schools in Surrey
Girls' schools in Surrey
Boarding schools in Surrey
Member schools of the Girls' Schools Association
Diamond schools
Church of England private schools in the Diocese of Guildford
Haslemere